Gunther Gebel-Williams (September 12, 1934 – July 19, 2001) was an animal trainer for Ringling Bros. and Barnum & Bailey Circus from 1968 to 1990.

Early life
Gebel was born in Schweidnitz, Lower Silesia (now Świdnica, Poland). As a child, he and his mother relocated to Germany, in all probability as part of the expulsion of ethnic Germans,  when Silesia was ceded to Poland after World War II. His father was missing in the Soviet Union.

Career
Gebel and his mother started working for Circus Williams in Germany in 1947. When its owner suddenly died, the owner's widow asked the 18-year-old Gebel to become the animal trainer which began his career. He then took on the additional surname Williams.

Gebel-Williams came to prominence during the early days of television when the circus was still a popular form of entertainment. His appearances on television shows like The Ed Sullivan Show and The Tonight Show Starring Johnny Carson, in addition to his work with the Ringling Bros. and Barnum & Bailey Circus, accelerated his renown as a tamer primarily of elephants and tigers. 

After retiring from the ring, he took a management position as Vice President of Animal Care for the circus. He passed down his skills as an animal trainer and performer to his son, Mark.

Death
Gebel-Williams died of a brain tumor on July 19, 2001 in Venice, Florida.

External links
 Lord of the Rings: Gunther Gebel-Williams at Ringling.com (archived)

References

1934 births
2001 deaths
People from Świdnica
German emigrants to the United States
Animal trainers
Elephant trainers
Lion tamers
People from the Province of Lower Silesia
Ringling Bros. and Barnum & Bailey Circus people
Deaths from cancer in Florida
20th-century circus performers